The diving competition at the 2009 World Aquatics Championships were held from July 17 to July 25. This diving competition complements the 2010 FINA Diving World Cup.

Medal table 

Record(*)

Medal summary

Men

Women

External links

 
2009 in diving
Diving
Diving at the World Aquatics Championships